The Convention of Democratic Forces (CFD) was a political alliance in Burkina Faso.

History
The CFD was established prior to the 2007 parliamentary elections as an alliance of the Convention for Democracy and Federation, the Greens of Burkina (both of which had previously been members of the Coalition of Democratic Forces), the Convention for Democracy and Liberty and the Rally for Independent Forces/Party of the Youth of Burkina.

The alliance won three seats in the 2007 elections, and retained all three in the 2012 election.

References

Defunct political party alliances in Burkina Faso